Aaj Ka Mahaatma is a 1976 Bollywood romantic action film directed by Kundan Kumar. The film stars Randhir Kapoor and Rekha.

Cast

Randhir Kapoor as Randhir / Ranveer (Double Role) 
Rekha as Mala
Ranjeet as Tony
Bindu as Julie
Manmohan as Shankar
Manmohan Krishna as Khanna
Jeevan as Head Clerk
Purnima as Ganga
M. B. Shetty as Shetty 
Keshto Mukherjee as Pedro
Dilip Dutt as William
Sanjana as Ruby
Manorama as Ruby's Mother
Ramesh Deo

Soundtrack
Alls songs were penned by Majrooh Sultanpuri

External links
 

1976 films
1970s Hindi-language films
1976 action films
Films scored by Laxmikant–Pyarelal
Indian action films
Hindi-language action films